The 1935–36 Luxembourg National Division was the 26th season of top level association football in Luxembourg.

Overview
It was contested by 10 teams, and CA Spora Luxembourg won the championship.

League standings

Results

References
Luxembourg - List of final tables (RSSSF)

Luxembourg National Division seasons
Lux
Nat